The British Rail Class 707 Desiro City is an electric multiple unit passenger train. Siemens Mobility built 30 five-carriage sets. Initially leased by South West Trains, its franchise successor South Western Railway began phasing them out of their network. Since September 2021, 18 have entered service with Southeastern. The remaining 12 are due to be transferred to Southeastern in 2023.

Background
In September 2014, South West Trains (SWT) announced plans to procure 30 five-car trains to expand its fleet to take advantage of significant infrastructure improvements that would allow the operation of ten-car trains. The Class 707 was the second product purchased for use on the British network from the Desiro City range, following the purchase of the Class 700 for Thameslink. All are leased from rolling stock company (ROSCO) Angel Trains.

Construction of the first vehicles began in June 2015, with the first completed in March 2016. The first two were completed as dual-voltage units with pantographs for operation on  overhead lines. This was a temporary arrangement for testing purposes at Siemens' Wildenrath test centre from May 2016. They also operated in England in this configuration, being tested operating on the East Coast Main Line to Peterborough.

The rest of the fleet was delivered with just  shoegear for use on third rail electrified lines, but all will have the ability to be modified for dual-voltage use if required in future. The first reached Britain on 9 December 2016.

Entry into service was originally planned for July 2017, with all 30 planned to be delivered by the end of 2017. However, the first units entered service on 17 August, just three days before the South Western franchise was taken over by South Western Railway on 20 August 2017. The last entered service in March 2018.

Due to lower leasing costs becoming available, SWR decided it would replace the Class 707s with Class 701 Aventras from 2021.

In April 2020, Southeastern signed a deal to lease the entire Class 707 fleet. The first four units were transferred in January 2021, with fourteen more following in small batches throughout the rest of 2021. The final twelve were expected to transfer to Southeastern by early 2022, but in January 2022 South Western Railway announced that continuing delays to its  program had resulted in it extending its lease on the remaining 12 units until late 2022. By November 2022 the lease had been extended again, into 2023.

Operation

The Class 707 was introduced on services between London Waterloo and Windsor & Eton Riverside and London Waterloo and Weybridge via Hounslow, allowing the Class 458 units used on those services to be cascaded back to operations to Reading, which then allowed the Class 450 units to move elsewhere on the network. The South Western Railway Class 707 units are based at the Wimbledon Traincare Depot.

The first Southeastern Class 707 units entered service on 27 September 2021. Passengers  praised the new trains for providing air conditioning and charging points for mobile devices, but expressed dissatisfaction that they were not fitted with toilets. Southeastern noted in response that it was "not practical" to install toilets in the already-built units, and that the  units already in use on the same routes were also not fitted with toilets.

Fleet details

Named units
The following units have received names:
707001: Spirit of Ukraine.
707005: Remembering Rt Hon James Brokenshire MP Old Bexley and Sidcup.

References

707
Siemens multiple units
Train-related introductions in 2017
750 V DC multiple units